James "Jim" Wiegold (15 April 1934 – 4 August 2009) was a Welsh mathematician.

Born in Trecenydd, Caerphilly, he earned a Ph.D. at the University of Manchester, England in 1958, studying under Bernhard Neumann, and is most notable for his contributions to group theory.

Wiegold died from leukaemia on 4 August 2009, in Penarth, Vale of Glamorgan.

Career
 Assistant Lecturer, University College of North Staffordshire (now Keele University), 1957–1960
 Lecturer, University of Manchester, 1960–1963
 Lecturer, University College of South Wales and Monmouthshire (now Cardiff University), 1963–1966
 Senior Lecturer, University College of South Wales and Monmouthshire (now Cardiff University), 1966–1969
 Visiting Senior Lecturer and Visiting Reader, Australian National University, 1968–1970
 Reader, University College of South Wales and Monmouthshire (now Cardiff University), 1969–1974
 Professor, University College, Cardiff (now Cardiff University), 1974–his death
 Dean of Science, University College, Cardiff (now Cardiff University), 1982–1985

References

External links
 
 

1934 births
2009 deaths
People from Caerphilly
Welsh mathematicians
20th-century British mathematicians
Group theorists
Academics of Cardiff University
Academics of the University of Manchester
Deaths from leukemia
Deaths from cancer in Wales